Muscle bike may refer to:
 Muscle bike (bicycle)
 Muscle bike (motorcycle)

See also
 Muscle car